ESO 540-030 is a faint dwarf galaxy in the Sculptor Group. It has the appearance of a massive scattering of dim stars.

The galaxy is located slightly more than 11 million light-years from Earth. It is difficult to observe due to galaxies situated behind ESO 540-030, and five bright stars between the galaxy and the Solar System. The brightest of them is located around 1500 light-years away from us.

References

Sculptor Group
Dwarf galaxies
Sculptor (constellation)
540-030
002881